Cicero Creek is a stream in western Washington County in the U.S. state of Missouri. It is a tributary of Brazil Creek.

The confluence is adjacent to Missouri Route W four miles south-southeast of Anthonies Mill.

Cicero Creek took its name from the nearby extinct community of Cicero.

See also
List of rivers of Missouri

References

Rivers of Washington County, Missouri
Rivers of Missouri